is a railway station in the city of Nakano, Nagano, Japan, operated by the private railway operating company Nagano Electric Railway.

Lines
Sakurasawa Station is a station on the Nagano Electric Railway Nagano Line and is 21.3 kilometers from the terminus of the line at Nagano Station.

Station layout
The station consists of one ground-level island platform connected to the station building by a level crossing. The station is unattended.

Platforms

Adjacent stations

History
The station opened on 28 March 1949.

Passenger statistics
In fiscal 2015, the station was used by an average of 55 passengers daily (boarding passengers only).

Surrounding area
Entoku Elementary School

See also
 List of railway stations in Japan

References

External links

 

Railway stations in Japan opened in 1949
Railway stations in Nagano Prefecture
Nagano Electric Railway
Nakano, Nagano